Castro is a city and commune on Chiloé Island in Chile. Castro is the capital of the Chiloé Province in the Los Lagos Region. The city is located on Estero de Castro on the eastern coast of central Chiloé Island. This position provides Castro with a good access to the eastern islands of Chiloé Archipelago as well as to the open ocean through Cucao and Huillinco to the west.

History 
Castro is Chile's third oldest city in continuous existence. Rodrigo de Quiroga as the temporary governor of Chile in 1567 launched a campaign led by his son in-law Captain Martín Ruiz de Gamboa to conquer Chiloé Island, establishing the city of Castro there, and subjugating its inhabitants, the Cuncos. From its founding on 12 February 1576 until 1767 Castro was the administrative centre of Chiloé Island. In 1594 Castro had 8,000 inhabitants most of whom were farmers. Up to the middle of the 17th century the town was looted by Dutch pirates several times.

In 1767, during the time of the Bourbon Reforms that sought to modernize the Spanish Empire, Chiloé was separated from the General Captaincy of Chile to which it had previously belonged and made a direct subject of the Viceroyalty of Peru. To ease the communications with Lima the capital of the archipelago was moved from Castro to Ancud in the same year. Even after the incorporation of Chiloé of into the Republic of Chile, Ancud remained the capital of the archipelago. Castro was destroyed by an earthquake in 1837 and had only 1,243 inhabitants in 1907. After the inauguration of the railway line to Ancud in 1912 the town developed better. Many buildings, including the railway station, town hall and many of the wooden palafitos houses, were destroyed or damaged by the earthquake and tsunami of 1960. In 1960, Castro had 7,000 inhabitants. Only in 1982 did Castro regain its role as the capital of the Chiloé Archipelago.

On December 10, 2021, a forest wildfire burns some of the parts of the city, causing many residents to evacuate.

Demographics
Of these, 29,148 (74%) lived in urban areas and 10,218 (26%) in rural areas. The population grew by 31.5% (9,435 persons) between the 1992 and 2002 censuses.

Administration

As a commune, Castro is a third-level administrative division of Chile administered by a municipal council, headed by an alcalde who is directly elected every four years. The 2012-2016 alcalde is Nelson Águila Serpa (PDC).

Within the electoral divisions of Chile, Castro is represented in the Chamber of Deputies by Gabriel Ascencio (PDC) and Alejandro Santana (RN) as part of the 58th electoral district, together with Ancud, Quemchi, Dalcahue, Curaco de Vélez, Quinchao, Puqueldón, Chonchi, Queilén, Quellón, Chaitén, Hualaihué, Futaleufú and Palena. The commune is represented in the Senate by Camilo Escalona Medina (PS) and Carlos Kuschel Silva (RN) as part of the 17th senatorial constituency (Los Lagos Region).

Sights 
Castro is famous for its palafitos, traditional wooden stilt houses which were common in many places in Chiloé. Some of them are preserved in the town district Gamboa in the west of the town in a bay called Fiordo de Castro. Boats are built in a traditional way in a wharf between the town center and Gamboa. In Gamboa there is an interesting wooden chapel as well.
Plaza de Armas, the central town square with its well-kept park, the Municipality and the church has always been the middle of Castro. The square is surrounded by many shops, banks, bars and restaurants.
The Regional Museum of Castro (Museo Regional de Castro) exhibits many objects made in Chiloé as well as samples of ethnography and archaeology.
The Museum of Modern Art of Chiloé (Museo de Arte Moderno de Chiloé) which was founded in 1988 houses an important collection of contemporary art.
A small park called Plazuela del Tren was laid out on the former railway yard close to the harbour. A locomotive and some other vehicles and machinery referring to the railway line to Ancud which was operated from 1912 to 1960 are exposed here.
In Nercón, a village which was incorporated into Castro in 2007, there is another sightworthy church which was declared World Heritage by the UNESCO: Nuestra Señora de Gracia was built 1886-90 of Nothofagus dombeyi wood, and a well-kept garden can be seen in front of it.
A small chapel with ex-votoes can be seen between Nercón and Castro at the bridge over River Nercón near a small wharf where boats are produced of larch wood

Colonial fort system

During colonial times, Castro was the site of a small fort system made up of Fuerte de Castro, Batería marítima de Castro and Fortín de Tauco. The last fortification is not located in Castro proper but a few kilometers south along Estero de Castro. Only the remnants of Fortín de Tauco can be found at present, there are no known vestiges of the two fortifications that were located in what is now the city of Castro.

Traffic connections 
The city is accessed by land by Route 5. From Castro nearly every village of Chiloé is easily accessible on a good paved road. There are good bus connections to most of the villages as well. The bus terminal is close to the central town square.

Since November 2012, domestic flights connecting the Island with the rest of the country arrive to Mocopulli Airport four times a week.

The railway line from Castro to Ancud was destroyed by the earthquake in 1960 and not rebuilt.

Sports
The city is home to Deportes Castro, 2012 champion of the Liga Nacional de Básquetbol de Chile. The team plays its home games in the Gimnasio Fiscal de Castro.

References

External links 

 
   Municipality of Castro
 Castro: History of the City and Legends from the area

 
Communes of Chile
Port cities in Chile
Populated places established in 1567
Capitals of Chilean provinces
Populated places in Chiloé
Populated places in Chiloé Province
1567 establishments in the Spanish Empire